Roger Douglas William Joslyn (born 7 May 1950) is an English former footballer, who played as a midfielder. He amassed over 500 appearances in the Football League for Colchester United, Aldershot, Watford and Reading.

Career 

Born in Colchester, Joslyn signed for hometown club Colchester United as an amateur at the age of seventeen, before turning professional at the end of the 1967–68 season. He joined Aldershot for a fee of £8,000 in October 1970. Four years later, Watford manager Mike Keen offered Aldershot £10,000 plus Pat Morrissey for Joslyn's services. Joslyn stayed at Vicarage Road for five years, 214 appearances and scoring 21 goals. He played a part in Watford's consecutive promotions under Graham Taylor, before being sold to Reading in November 1979 for £40,000. Joslyn retired from football in January 1981 due to an arthritic hip. After retiring from football, Joslyn moved into business, and now runs a furniture manufacturing company.

Honours

Club 
Watford
 Football League Third Division Runner-up (1): 1978–79
 Football League Fourth Division Winner (1): 1977–78

Individual 
 PFA Team of the Year (1): 1977–78

References 

1950 births
Living people
Sportspeople from Colchester
Colchester United F.C. players
Aldershot F.C. players
Watford F.C. players
Reading F.C. players
English Football League players
Association football midfielders
English footballers